The United States Constitution Bicentennial commemorative coins are a series of commemorative coins which were issued by the United States Mint in 1987.

Legislation 
The Bicentennial of the Constitution Coins and Medals Act authorized the production of two coins, a silver dollar and a gold half eagle, to commemorate the bicentennial of the signing of the US Constitution.  The act allowed the coins to be struck in both proof and uncirculated finishes.

Designs

Dollar 

The obverse of the United States Constitution Bicentennial dollar, designed by Patricia L. Verani, features a sheaf of parchments, a quill pen, and the words "We the People".  The reverse, also designed by Verani, portrays a cross section of Americans from various periods of history.

Half eagle 

The obverse of the United States Constitution Bicentennial half eagle, designed by Marcel Jovine, features a modernistic, highly stylized eagle holding a quill pen. The reverse, also by Jovine, features a quill pen with the words, "We the People".

Specifications 
Dollar
 Display Box Color: Navy Blue
 Edge: Reeded
 Weight: 26.730 grams; 0.8594 troy ounce
 Diameter: 38.10 millimeters; 1.50 inches
 Composition: 90% Silver, 10% Copper

Half Eagle
 Display Box Color: Navy Blue
 Edge: Reeded
 Weight: 8.359 grams; 0.2687 troy ounce
 Diameter: 21.59 millimeters; 0.850 inch
 Composition: 90% Gold, 3.6% Silver, 6.4% Copper

See also

 United States commemorative coins
 List of United States commemorative coins and medals (1980s)
 Bill of Rights commemorative coins

References

Modern United States commemorative coins
Bicentennial anniversaries
Gold coins
Silver coins